Pourvu que ça dure – Chante en Français is a compilation album by the British singer Sandie Shaw, containing a selection of French-language recordings of some of her original hits. It was released in 2003 by EMI.

Track listing

 "Toujours un coin qui me rapelle" ("(There's) Always Something There to Remind Me")
 "Ne crois pas" ("Don't You Know")
 "Mais tu l'aimes" ("Girl Don't Come")
 "Rien n'empêchera l'amour" ("I'll Stop at Nothing")
 "Pourvu que ça dure" ("Long Live Love")
 "Il a de la peine" ("As Long As You're Happy Baby")
 "Tu l'as bien compris" ("Message Understood")
 "Demain" ("Tomorrow")
 "Stop je peux t'aimer" ("Stop Before You Start")
 "J'ai raison" ("How Can You Tell")
 "Je pense à toi" ("Think Sometimes About Me")
 "L'orage" ("Run")
 "Je ne marche pas" ("Keep In Touch")
 "Rien n'est fini (Guardo te che te ne vai)"
 "Un tout petit panton" ("Puppet on a String")
 "J'ai rêvé de lui" ("Had a Dream Last Night")
 "Prends la vie du bon côté" ("Tell The Boys")
 "Tout est changé" ("I Don't Think You Want Me Anymore")
 "Aujourd'hui" ("Today")
 "C'est pourquoi" ("That's Why")
 "Le temps des fleurs" ("Those Were the Days")
 "Monsieur Dupont"
 "Comme un Français" ("Think It All Over")
 "Frank Mills" (from Hair)
 "Wight Is Wight"
 "Maybe I'm Amazed"

2003 compilation albums
Sandie Shaw albums
French-language compilation albums
EMI Records compilation albums